Jan Ingemar Stenmark  (born 18 March 1956) is a Swedish former World Cup alpine ski racer. He is regarded as one of the most prominent Swedish athletes ever, and as the greatest slalom and giant slalom specialist of all time. He competed for Tärna IK Fjällvinden.

Biography

Born in Joesjö, Storuman Municipality, Lapland, Stenmark's family moved to Tärnaby near Norway when he was four years old. He became a childhood neighbour of Stig Strand (also born 1956), who tied Stenmark for the World Cup slalom title in 1983. Stenmark began skiing at the age of five and won his first national competition at age eight.

Competitive record
Stenmark made his World Cup debut in December 1973 at age 17. At the time of his retirement, he had won more international races than any other alpine skier to date: he took 86 World Cup wins (46 giant slaloms and 40 slaloms). He has since been passed by Mikaela Shiffrin. Stenmark won only in the two technical disciplines: slalom and giant slalom (the other events are downhill, super-G, first run in December 1982, and combined). Stenmark still has the record for the biggest win margin in a World Cup alpine race: 4.06 seconds ahead of 2nd placed Bojan Križaj in Jasna on 4 February 1979. Stenmark was known as a quiet champion, with short, but polite, responses to media questions.

For his three straight World Cup titles (1976–78), Stenmark earned the Holmenkollen medal in 1979 (shared with Erik Håker and Raisa Smetanina). Stenmark also earned the Svenska Dagbladet Gold Medal twice (1975, 1978). His 1978 medal was shared with tennis player Björn Borg, making them the only two men to ever win the honor twice (female alpine skier Anja Pärson received the medal in 2006 and 2007).

At the World Championships in 1978 in Garmisch-Partenkirchen West Germany, Stenmark won the slalom by two-thirds of a second and the giant slalom by over two seconds, and successfully defended both world titles at the Winter Olympics in 1980 at Lake Placid, which also were counted as world championships. At the next worlds in 1982 in Austria, he had a sub-standard first run in the giant slalom and was upset by American Steve Mahre and settled for silver. Stenmark rebounded in the slalom and became the first to win the same title in three consecutive world championships. At age 25, it was his final medal in a major competition.

Stenmark was not allowed to participate in the 1984 Winter Olympics in Sarajevo by the International Ski Federation (FIS) for accepting promotional payments directly, rather than through the national ski federation. Hanni Wenzel of Liechtenstein was also banned; both were double gold medalists in 1980. Marc Girardelli, who was the best slalom racer during the 1983–84 season, wasn't allowed to participate either. In his case it was because he didn't have citizenship in Luxembourg, the country for which he competed. Stenmark was allowed back into the Olympic competition in 1988, but was past his prime and did not win a medal (however, he had the fastest second run of the slalom competition). He retired from World Cup competition at the end of the 1989 season in March, days before his 33rd birthday.

Other
During the years from 1976 to 1978 Stenmark, along with tennis player Björn Borg, became a national icon in Sweden. This was not changed by the fact that he moved to Monaco in 1980 for tax reasons. At age 40, he won the Swedish Superstars championship in 1996. On 26 December 2004, Stenmark survived the Indian Ocean earthquake while on vacation in Thailand. In 2015, he was a celebrity dancer on the Let's Dance 2015, where he teamed up with professional dancer Cecilia Ehrling.

Personal
Stenmark was married to Ann Uvhagen, a Lufthansa airline hostess, 1984–1987. They have a daughter, born 1984.

World Cup results

Season titles
 19 titles – (3 overall, 8 GS, 8 SL)

Season standings

Race victories
86 wins – (46 GS, 40 SL), 155 podiums

Podiums

World championship results

From 1948 through 1980, the Winter Olympics were also the World Championships for alpine skiing.
At the World Championships from 1954 through 1980, the combined was a "paper race" using the results of the three events (DH, GS, SL).

Olympic results

Stenmark and fellow reigning double Olympic champion Hanni Wenzel were banned from the 1984 Olympics for having accepted promotional payments directly, rather than through their national ski federations.

References

External links
 
 
  

1956 births
Swedish male alpine skiers
Alpine skiers at the 1976 Winter Olympics
Alpine skiers at the 1980 Winter Olympics
Alpine skiers at the 1988 Winter Olympics
Olympic alpine skiers of Sweden
Medalists at the 1976 Winter Olympics
Medalists at the 1980 Winter Olympics
Olympic medalists in alpine skiing
Olympic gold medalists for Sweden
Olympic bronze medalists for Sweden
FIS Alpine Ski World Cup champions
Holmenkollen medalists
Swedish expatriates in Monaco
People from Storuman Municipality
Living people
Tärna IK Fjällvinden skiers
People from Tärna
Sportspeople from Västerbotten County